Crestwood Elementary School can refer to:

 Crestwood Elementary School, part of the Visalia Unified School District in Visalia, California
 Crestwood Elementary School, part of the Oldham County Schools of Oldham County, Kentucky
 Crestwood Elementary School, part of the Clark County School District in Las Vegas, Nevada
 Crestwood Elementary School, part of the Fairfax County Public Schools of Springfield, Virginia